Because modern Belgium is a multilingual country, Belgian literature is often treated as a branch of French literature or Dutch literature. 
Some writing also exists in the regional languages of Belgium, with published works in both the Walloon language, closely related to French, and also in various regional Flemish or Dutch-related dialects.

German is the third official language in Belgium and is spoken by a small community of about 70,000 German-speakers of the German-speaking Community of Belgium in the border region Eupen-Malmedy. See :de:Belgische_Literatur#Die_deutsche_Literatur_in_Belgien.

Dutch/Flemish writers

Hendrik Conscience (1812 – 1883), author of The Lion of Flanders'' (1838)
Guido Gezelle (1830 –  1899), noted for his use of West Flemish dialect 
Cyriel Buysse (1859 – 1932)
Willem Elsschot (pseudonym of Alphonsus Josephus de Ridder, 1882 – 1960)
Marnix Gijsen (pen name of Joannes Alphonsius Albertus Goris, 1899 – 1984)
Louis Paul Boon (1912 – 1979)
Hugo Claus (1929 – 2008)
Jef Geeraerts (1930 – 2015)
Eric de Kuyper (born 1942)
Herman de Coninck (1944 – 1997) poet
Herman Brusselmans (born 1957)
Tom Lanoye (born 1958)
Erwin Mortier  (born 1965)
Dimitri Verhulst  (born 1972)

See also
Flemish Community
 Lijst van Vlaamse schrijvers (list of Flemish authors)

Belgian literature in French 

 Nicolas Ancion
 Charles De Coster
 Michel de Ghelderode
André-Paul Duchâteau
Maurice Grevisse
Georges Simenon
Alain Le Bussy
Francis Baudouin
Suzanne Lilar
Maurice Maeterlinck
Thierry Martens
Pierre Mertens
Henri Michaux
Amélie Nothomb
Jean Ray aka John Flanders for his works in Dutch
J.H. Rosny and J.-H. Rosny aîné & J.-H. Rosny jeune
Stanislas-André Steeman
Jean-Philippe Toussaint
Emile Verhaeren
Henri Vernes
Arthur Xhignesse
Marguerite Yourcenar
Francophone literature
Belgian French
French Community of Belgium

Belgian literature in Walloon

Literature in Walloon has been printed since the 16th century or at least since the beginning of the 17th century. Its golden age was in the 19th century:  'That period saw an efflorescence of Walloon literature, plays and poems primarily, and the founding of many theaters and periodicals.'  Yves Quairiaux counted 4800 plays for 1860–1914, published or not.  In this period plays were almost the only popular show in Wallonia. But this theater remains popular in present-day Wallonia: Theatre is still flourishing with over 200 non-professional companies playing in the cities and villages of Wallonia for an audience of over 200,000 each year. Jacques Ancion wanted to develop a regular adult audience. This regional literature most commonly deals with local folklore and ancient traditions, the most prominent Walloon author being Arthur Masson.
 Charles-Nicolas Simonon (1774-1847): "Li Côparèye" (1822)
 Nicolas Defrecheux (1825-1874): "Lèyîs-m'plorer" (Let me weep, 1854)
 Edward Remouchamps (1836-1900) wrote the vaudeville theater piece "Tatî l'pèriquî"  (Gautier, the barber, 1885)
 Salme Dieudonné: the novel "Li Houlot" (The cadet, 1888)
 Willame Georges (1863-1917), sonnets
 François Renkin (1872-1906), stylized prose
 Henri Simon (1856-1939): "Li Mwert di l'abe" (The death of the tree, 1909) and "Li pan dè bon Dieu" (The Bread of the Good Lord, 1914)
 Jules Claskin (1884-1926), poetry
 Laloux Auguste (1908-1976): "Li p'tit Bêrt", written before 1940, published in 1963
 Geo Libbrecht (1891-1976): poetry, "Les cloques / Les cleokes (1964)."

See also
Belgian comics
French literature
Dutch literature

External links

 Hendrik Conscience Heritage Library Antwerp for Flemish and French literature in Belgium

Notes and references
Notes:

References:

 
Belgian writers in French